Association Sportive Francilienne 94 Le Perreux is a French football club located in Le Perreux-sur-Marne, France. The club was formerly known as AS Française from 1896 to 1988.

History 
The club was founded in 1896 as Association Sportive Française. Their best ever result was in the amateur era, as they came in second for the 1912 USFSA Football Championship. In 1988, they changed their name to AS Francilienne. They are known as ASF Le Perreux.

Colours and badge 
Their traditional colours are blue and red.

Honours
 USFSA Football Championship
 Runners-up: 1911-1912

References

External links
Official Facebook site

Association football clubs established in 1896
Sport in Val-de-Marne
Football clubs in Paris
Le Perreux